Kristina Mladenovic was the defending champion, but decided not to participate.

Alison Van Uytvanck won the tournament, defeating fellow Belgian Yanina Wickmayer in the final, 6–4, 6–2.

Seeds

Main draw

Finals

Top half

Bottom half

References 
 Main draw
 Qualifying draw

OEC Taipei WTA Ladies Open - Singles
Taipei WTA Ladies Open
2013 in Taiwanese tennis